Pink flowers are used as a symbol of love and awareness. For decades, pink flowers have been used to decorate weddings as a symbol of love. They can also be used as a display of love at funerals, as demonstrated at the funeral for Anna Nicole Smith.

More recently, pink flowers have come to symbolize breast cancer awareness.

They may also be used as an expression of thanks, or just enjoyed for their aesthetic beauty.

Species
 
Species of pink flowers include:
Allium (flowering onion)
Astilbe
Azalea
Begonias
Butterfly bush
Camellia
Carambola tree (starfruit)
Carnation
Cherry
Clematis
Coneflower (Echinacea)
Cypripedium acaule (lady's slipper orchids)
Dahlia
Dianthus family (carnation, pink, and sweet william, and especially garden pink, whence the colour got its name)
Flowering plum tree
Hibiscus
Hyacinth
Hydrangea growing in alkaline (basic) soil
Oriental lily
Papaver orientale (Oriental poppy)
Peony / paeony
Petunia
Rhododendron and Azalea
Roses
Sabatia angularis (rosepink or bitterbloom)
Tulips
Vinca
Alumroot
Aster
Forget-me-not (Myosotis)
Orchid

References

Flora